Waleed Abdullah Ameir Al-Saadi (born 19 February 1995), commonly known as Waleed Al-Saadi, is an Omani footballer who the current assistant coach for Oman.

Club career
On 10 June 2014, he signed a one-year contract extension with Al-Musannah SC.

Club career statistics

International career
Waleed is part of the first team squad of the Oman national football team. He was selected for the national team for the first time in 2012. He made his first appearance for Oman on 8 November 2012 in a friendly match against Estonia. He has made appearances in the 2012 WAFF Championship and the 2014 FIFA World Cup qualification.

Honours

Club
Omani League (1): 2012–13
Omani Super Cup (1): 2013; Runners-Up 2011
Sultan Qaboos Cup (1): 2012–13

Individual
Omani League : Top Scorer-2011-12

References

External links

1995 births
Living people
People from Muscat, Oman
Omani footballers
Oman international footballers
Association football forwards
Suwaiq Club players
Al-Musannah SC players
Oman Professional League players
Footballers at the 2010 Asian Games
Asian Games competitors for Oman